The Henichesk Strait (alternatively Genichesk Strait;) is a narrow strait which connects the Syvash (the shallow lagoon system separating the Crimea from the rest of Ukraine east of the Isthmus of Perekop) with the Sea of Azov. It separates the Arabat Spit from the Ukrainian mainland.

On account of its narrowness, it is also sometimes called Thin Strait. The direction of flow depends on the wind. On the north side of the strait is the town and port of Henichesk in the Ukraine.

Although the strait separates the Crimea from the Ukrainian mainland geographically, it does not do so politically: both sides of the strait are in the Ukrainian Kherson Oblast, and the political and military boundary between Kherson Oblast and the disputed polity described either as the Ukrainian Autonomous Republic of Crimea or the Russian Republic of Crimea lies further south on the Arabat Spit.

References

External links
Detailed topographical and hydrological map 

Straits of Ukraine
Straits of Crimea
Geography of Kherson Oblast
Sea of Azov